Microsoft Language Portal is a multilingual online dictionary of computing terms.

It also offers free downloads of localization style guides, translations of user interface text, and a feedback feature. It was made public in 2009.

References

External links
 MS Language Portal

Online dictionaries
Multilingual dictionaries
Microsoft websites
Translation databases
Glossaries
Internationalization and localization
Style guides for technical and scientific writing